The qualification play-offs for the 2009 UEFA European Under-21 Championship took place from 10 October to 15 October 2008. The ten group winners and four best runners-up from the qualifying group stage were drawn together in pairs in order to determine the seven teams that joined hosts Sweden at the 2009 UEFA European Under-21 Championship.

Matches

|}

First leg

Second leg

3–3 on aggregate. Finland won 4–2 on penalties.

Belarus won 2–1 on aggregate.

England won 5–4 on aggregate.

Spain won 4–3 on aggregate.

Serbia won 2–0 on aggregate.

Germany won 2–1 on aggregate.

Italy won 3–1 on aggregate.

External links
Play-off fixtures

Play-offs
2009